Natividade refers to the following places in Brazil:

 Natividade, Rio de Janeiro
 Natividade, Tocantins
 Natividade da Serra, São Paulo